Alejandro Orózco (born 12 February 1965) is a Mexican equestrian. He competed in the individual jumping event at the 1988 Summer Olympics.

References

1965 births
Living people
Mexican male equestrians
Olympic equestrians of Mexico
Equestrians at the 1988 Summer Olympics
Place of birth missing (living people)